Johanna Knoll is a retired German rower who won a bronze medal in the quad sculls at the 1957 European Championships.

References

Year of birth missing (living people)
Living people
East German female rowers
European Rowing Championships medalists